Jeffrey Simmons Patterson (born October 1, 1968) is a former Major League Baseball pitcher. Patterson was drafted by the Philadelphia Phillies in the 58th round of the 1988 draft. He allowed 3 hits in 3.1 innings pitched with an Earned run average of 2.70.

Patterson played college baseball at Cypress College. In 1989, he set a school record by striking out 129 batters in a single season. That record would stand until 1999.

References

External links

1968 births
Living people
Baseball players from California
Cypress Chargers baseball players
Major League Baseball pitchers
New York Yankees players
Batavia Clippers players
Clearwater Phillies players
Columbus Clippers players
Martinsville Phillies players
Reading Phillies players
Scranton/Wilkes-Barre Red Barons players
Spartanburg Phillies players